Lieu Da-Kuin or Liu Dajun  (1891–1962),  also alternatively spelled as Dakuin K. Lieu, commonly known in English as D. K. Lieu, was a prominent Chinese economist in the twentieth century. Together with Ma Yinchu, He Lian and Fang Xianting, he is described as one of the "Four Major Economists of the Republic of China".

Biography
Dakuin K. Lieu, ancestrally from Dantu, Jiangsu, was born in Huai'an, Jiangsu, in 1891.  He received private tutoring until 1905, went to Shanghai to attend the Y.M.C.A. School, and graduated from Imperial University (currently Peking University) in 1911.  

After graduating from the Imperial University, Lieu went to the United States to study at the University of Michigan, where he studied economics and statistics at the University of Michigan under the tutelage of Henry Carter Adams and Fred M. Taylor,  receiving his bachelor's degree in 1915.

Upon his return to China, he taught English for a short time at  Qinghua  and soon became one of China's leading economic commentators.

He retained links to the University of Michigan through the Michigan Club of Peking of which he was president in 1921.

In 1945, Lieu served as the Chinese representative to the United Nations Statistical Commission, and in 1947, he became the Economic Counselor at the National Government Embassy in the United States. He retired in 1953 and resided in the US, where he died in 1962.

Works

References

1891 births
Chinese economists
Imperial University of Peking alumni
University of Michigan College of Literature, Science, and the Arts alumni
Academic staff of Tsinghua University
1962 deaths